Jiří Bělohradský (born 20 January 1999) is a Czech competitive figure skater. He is the 2015 Merano Cup bronze medalist and two-time Czech national champion. He has qualified for the free skate at three ISU Championships.

Personal life 
Jiří Bělohradský was born on 20 January 1999 in Mariánské Lázně, Czech Republic. He is the older brother of Czech figure skater Matyáš Bělohradský.

Career 
Bělohradský's ISU Junior Grand Prix (JGP) debut came in the 2014–15 season; he placed 14th in Ljubljana, Slovenia in late August 2014 and 18th in Zagreb, Croatia in October. He was selected to compete at the 2015 World Junior Championships in Tallinn, Estonia, but was eliminated after placing 39th in the short program. He trained under Monika Škorničková in Mariánské Lázně until the end of the season.

Bělohradský changed coaches ahead of the 2015–16 season, joining Vlasta Kopřivová in Prague. In September, he competed at two 2015 JGP events, finishing 18th in Linz, Austria and 11th in Toruń, Poland. Making his senior international debut, he placed 9th at the 2015 Ice Challenge, an ISU Challenger Series (CS) event  in October. He won a bronze medal at the Merano Cup and placed 10th at the NRW Trophy. In December, he made his first senior national podium, taking silver behind Michal Březina.

Bělohradský was selected to compete at the 2016 European Championships in Bratislava, Slovakia as the Czech Republic's second entry in the men's event. Ranked 19th in the short program, he qualified for the free skate and finished 20th overall. He also reached the final segment at the 2016 World Junior Championships in Debrecen, Hungary, placing 16th in both segments and overall.

Programs

Competitive highlights 
CS: Challenger Series; JGP: Junior Grand Prix

Men's singles

Pairs with Vanessa Štefanová

References

External links 
 
 

1999 births
Living people
People from Mariánské Lázně
Czech male single skaters
Sportspeople from the Karlovy Vary Region